Thomas Charles Agar-Robartes, 6th Viscount Clifden (1 January 1844 – 19 July 1930), styled The Honourable Thomas Agar-Robartes between 1869 and 1882 and known as The Lord Robartes from 1882 to 1899, was a British landowner and Liberal politician.

Background and education
Agar-Robartes was born at Grosvenor Place, London, the son of Thomas Agar-Robartes, 1st Baron Robartes, and Juliana Pole-Carew, daughter of Reginald Pole-Carew, of East Antony, Cornwall. He was educated at Harrow and Christ Church, Oxford, and was called to the Bar at the Middle Temple in 1870.

On the death of his father in 1882 he inherited the Lanhydrock estate in Cornwall and arranged for Lanhydrock House to be rebuilt following a fire in 1881 that had killed his mother. He and his family were to live there from 1885.

Public life
In 1880 Agar-Robartes was returned to Parliament as one of two representatives for Cornwall East, a seat he held until 1882, when he succeeded his father in the barony and entered the House of Lords. On 10 September 1899 he also succeeded his kinsman as sixth Viscount Clifden.

In 1891, as chairman of the Agar-Robartes Bank, he took over the ownership of Wimpole Hall in Cambridgeshire from Charles Yorke, 5th Earl of Hardwicke in payment of debts. After a few years, it was leased out. He later served as Lord-Lieutenant of Cambridgeshire from 1906 to 1915.

Family

Lord Clifden married Mary Dickinson, daughter of Francis Henry Dickinson, of Kingweston House, Somerset, in 1878. They had ten children, of whom one died in infancy. Their eldest son the Honourable Thomas Agar-Robartes (had a twin sister) was also a Liberal politician, killed in World War I.

Lady Clifden died in January 1921. Lord Clifden survived her by nine years and died in July 1930, aged 86. He was buried at Lanhydrock House, Cornwall. He was succeeded in his titles by his second but eldest surviving son Francis.

References

External links

1844 births
1930 deaths
Viscounts in the Peerage of Ireland
People educated at Harrow School
Alumni of Christ Church, Oxford
Agar-Robartes, Thomas
Liberal Party (UK) MPs for English constituencies
UK MPs 1880–1885
UK MPs who inherited peerages
Politicians from Cornwall
Members of the Middle Temple
Lord-Lieutenants of Cambridgeshire
People from Lanhydrock
19th-century English politicians
Thomas
Eldest sons of British hereditary barons